Christopher Cross is a settlement in Prince Edward Island. Christopher Cross, an unincorporated area, is located in Prince County in the western portion of Prince Edward Island, N. of Tignish. Its precise location is N 46°59', W 64°03

The community is bordered by the Town of Tignish, Anglo-Tignish, SeaCow Pond, Norway, Nail Pond and Ascension, PE.

The community is named after James Christopher, a blacksmith who had a shop at the intersection of Norway Road and Route 14.

Communities in Prince County, Prince Edward Island